"Exit Sign" is a song by Australian hip hop group Hilltop Hoods featuring Illy and Ecca Vandal, released on 23 February 2019 as the third and final single from their eighth studio album The Great Expanse (2019).

At the ARIA Music Awards of 2019, "Exit Sign" was nominated for ARIA Award for Best Video.

At the APRA Music Awards of 2020, "Exit Sign" was nominated for Most Performed Urban Work of the Year.

Track listings

Charts

Weekly charts

Year-end charts

Certifications

References

2019 singles
2019 songs
Hilltop Hoods songs
Ecca Vandal songs
Illy (rapper) songs
Songs written by DJ Debris
Songs written by Illy (rapper)
Songs written by MC Pressure
Songs written by Sarah Aarons
Songs written by Suffa
Universal Music Australia singles